Angie Coiro is an American talk radio host. She is the host and senior producer of In Deep with Angie Coiro (formerly known as The Green Show). Prior to that, she was the host of Mother Jones Radio on Air America Radio. The program was broadcast every Sunday until it was canceled in 2007. She is a founder and co-owner of Internet TV channel MixTV, based in Berkeley, CA.

Coiro began her broadcasting career in Indiana at WETL-FM, and continued at KGU-AM in Honolulu, eventually moving to San Francisco for an announcer stint at National Public Radio KALW-FM. In 1990 she moved to National Public Radio station KQED, reporting traffic, and filling in for Michael Krasny's show Forum on Fridays. Her show on KKGN was briefly canceled as of December 31, 2008. KKGN management would not comment on her departure. The show returned to Green 960 (KKGN) on March 30, 2009, as an independent production and was renamed as "LIVE FROM THE LEFT COAST with Angie Coiro" on June 9, 2009. Coiro is noted for her upbeat and civil manner, even with combative guests.

"In Deep with Angie Coiro" began as The Angie Coiro Show on local San Francisco radio, and became an independent production in 2007. She focuses on "genuine conversations - real give and take with smart thinkers, entertaining personalities, and influential political figures. In a world of short sound bites, quick cuts, and extravagant production, [she] produce[s] 'one full hour on one intriguing topic'" on KALW San Francisco Tuesdays 9–10 pm Pacific Standard Time (PST) and KZSU Stanford, CA at 10–11 am PST. Angie is on staff as the journalist in residence at Kepler's Literary Foundation (KLF), where she hosts the series "This Is Now," broadcast under the name "In Deep With Angie Coiro." The series is recorded live at Menlo College in Atherton, and at Kepler's Books in Menlo Park, free of charge.  The schedule varies; view the upcoming KLF schedule or join the email list for regular updates. Angie is a frequent fill-in host for KGO Radio San Francisco.

See also
 Air America Radio
 Mother Jones
 KNEW (AM)
 KALW
 KZSU (FM)
 KGO (AM)

References

External links
 
 Mother Jones Radio website
 MixTV
 

Year of birth missing (living people)
Living people
American talk radio hosts
American women radio presenters